Manuel Figueroa (8 May 1904 – 23 April 1986) was a Chilean footballer. He played in one match for the Chile national football team in 1926. He was also part of Chile's squad for the 1926 South American Championship.

References

External links
 

1904 births
1986 deaths
Chilean footballers
Chile international footballers
Place of birth missing
Association football defenders
C.D. Arturo Fernández Vial footballers